Jason Glenn Vosler (born September 6, 1993) is an American professional baseball third baseman in the Cincinnati Reds organization. He played college baseball for Northeastern University, and was drafted by the Chicago Cubs in the 16th round of the 2014 Major League Baseball draft. He made his Major League Baseball (MLB) debut in 2021 with the San Francisco Giants.

Career

Early career
Vosler attended Don Bosco Preparatory High School in Ramsey, New Jersey. He played three years of varsity baseball at shortstop. He was second team All-League in 2010, and first team All-State, first team All-County, and first team All-League in 2011. In 2011 he batted .518 with 36 runs, 10 doubles, two triples, two homers and 35 RBIs with 15 walks and four strikeouts in 106 plate appearances. He also played wing in varsity hockey.

He played college baseball for three seasons at Northeastern University, batting .307/.369/.446. In 2012 he won the Colonial Athletic Association (CAA) Rookie of the Year award, and was an All-CAA Third Team selection at second base.

Chicago Cubs
He was drafted by the Chicago Cubs in the 16th round of the 2014 Major League Baseball draft, and signed. Vosler made his professional debut that year with the Boise Hawks, batting .266/.361/.372 with one home run and 11 RBIs in 30 games. 

Vosler played for the South Bend Cubs and Myrtle Beach Pelicans in 2015 where hit a combined .238/.323/.374 with ten home runs and 40 RBIs in 107 games. In 2016 he played for Myrtle Beach and the Cubs Double-A affiliate, the Tennessee Smokies where he slashed .254/.323/.359 with three home runs and 51 RBIs in 119 games. 

He returned to Tennessee in 2017,  He batted .241/.343/.429 with 70 runs (7th in the league), 21 home runs (2nd), and 81 RBIs (2nd) in 452 at bats over 129 games. He was named a 2017 Southern League Mid-Season and Post-Season All Star, and a 2017 MiLB Organization All Star. After the 2017 season, he played in the Arizona Fall League, batting .210. 

Vosler began the 2018 season with Tennessee and played in 66 games before being promoted to the Cubs Triple-A affiliate, the Iowa Cubs.  In 2018, he hit a combined .251/.330/.467 with 23 home runs and 93 RBIs in 471 at bats while playing 129 games. He was named a 2018 Southern League mid-season All Star, and a 2018 MiLB Organization All Star.

San Diego Padres
On November 20, 2018, the Cubs traded Vosler to the San Diego Padres for pitcher Rowan Wick. 

He spent 2019 with the Class AAA El Paso Chihuahuas, slashing .290/.367/.523 with 20 home runs and 63 RBIs in 375 at bats over 116 games. This became his third consecutive year of hitting 20 or more home runs in a season. 

Vosler did not play in a game in 2020 due to the cancellation of the Minor League Baseball season because of the COVID-19 pandemic. He became a free agent on November 2, 2020.

San Francisco Giants
On November 10, 2020, Vosler signed a major league contract with the San Francisco Giants. On April 24, 2021, Vosler was promoted to the major leagues for the first time. He made his MLB debut that day against the Miami Marlins as a pinch hitter for Kevin Gausman, popping out against Dylan Floro in his only at bat. On April 25, Vosler recorded his first MLB hit, a single off of Marlins pitcher Richard Bleier. On May 26, Vosler hit his first major league home run, a go-ahead solo homer off Alex Young of the Arizona Diamondbacks.

In the 2021 regular season, for the Giants he batted .178/.256/.356 with 12 runs, 3 home runs, and 9 RBIs in 73 at bats. He played 19 games at third base, 3 games at second base, 3 games at first base, 2 games in left field, and one game in right field. With AAA Sacramento, he batted .295/.385/.529 with 51 runs, 15 home runs, and 51 RBIs in 261 at bats.

In 2022 with the Giants he batted .265/.342/.469 in 98 at bats, with 14 runs, four home runs, and 12 RBIs. He played 29 games at third base, three in left field, two at first base, and one each at second base, shortstop, and right field. With AAA Sacramento he batted .242/.311/.433 in 360 at bats, with 18 home runs and 47 RBIs.

On November 18, 2022, he was non-tendered and became a free agent.

Cincinnati Reds
On January 25, 2023, Vosler signed a minor league contract with the Seattle Mariners organization. He was released just three days later on January 28.
                         
On February 1, 2023, Vosler signed a minor league contract with the Cincinnati Reds organization.

References

External links

Northeastern Huskies bio

1993 births
Living people
Don Bosco Preparatory High School alumni
People from West Nyack, New York
Baseball players from New York (state)
Major League Baseball infielders
San Francisco Giants players
Northeastern Huskies baseball players
Boise Hawks players
South Bend Cubs players
Myrtle Beach Pelicans players
Tennessee Smokies players
Mesa Solar Sox players
Iowa Cubs players
El Paso Chihuahuas players